TQ or tq may refer to:

 TQ (singer) (born 1976), real name Terrance Quaites, American R&B singer
 TQ postcode area, a United Kingdom postcode for the area of Torquay
 Tandem Aero (IATA airline code TQ)
 Al-Taqaddum Air Base, Iraq
 Techniquest, a collection of science and discovery centres in Wales
 Télé-Québec (TQ or TQc), a Canadian French language public educational television network
 ThinkQuest, a student webpage building competition
 Titan Quest, a 2006 action role-playing computer game
 Top qualifier, in radio-controlled car racing
 The Quietus, a music magazine abbreviated as tQ

See also

 
 TQS
 QT (disambiguation)